
Kilbirnie railway station was a railway station serving the town of Kilbirnie, North Ayrshire, Scotland. The station was part of the Dalry and North Johnstone Line on the Glasgow and South Western Railway.

History 

The station opened on 1 June 1905, and closed to passengers on 27 June 1966. The station's island platform remains in place and intact, however the trackbed is now part of National Cycle Route 7.

References

Notes

Sources 
 

Disused railway stations in North Ayrshire
Railway stations in Great Britain opened in 1905
Railway stations in Great Britain closed in 1966
Beeching closures in Scotland
Former Glasgow and South Western Railway stations